Brownsboro is a city in Henderson County, Texas, United States. The population was 1,212 at the 2020 census, up from 1,039 at the 2010 census. The city is on Texas State Highway 31.

History

Brownsboro was first settled in 1849 by John (Red) Brown, who operated a toll bridge across Kickapoo Creek on the road to Jordan's Saline and Tyler. By 1860, Henry Cade had erected a sawmill and a cotton gin. With the construction of the St. Louis Southwestern Railway through the county in 1880, the town moved to the railroad.

The town of Normandy was near the site of present Brownsboro. It was established in 1845 by Johan Reinert Reiersen of Kristiansand,  Norway, who urged Norwegian immigrants to settle in the new community. In the summer of 1847, a number of settlers died and many of the Norwegian immigrants moved to Four Mile Prairie in Van Zandt County and Prairieville in Kaufman County, also established by Reiersen.

A Norwegian Lutheran church and cemetery were established in Normandy in 1853, but after that the community merged into the Brownsboro settlement. A nearby Lutheran church served as the chapel for the cemetery until the 1920s.

Geography

Brownsboro is located in northeastern Henderson County at  (32.300745, –95.615022). Texas State Highway 31 passes through the city, leading east  to Tyler and southwest  to Athens, the Henderson county seat.

The city is on the south side of the valley of Kickapoo Creek, an east-flowing tributary of the Neches River.

Demographics

As of the 2020 United States census, there were 1,212 people, 506 households, and 421 families residing in the city.

As of the census of 2010, there were 1,039 people, 291 households, and 220 families residing in the city. The population density was 407.0 people per square mile (156.8/km2). There were 323 housing units at an average density of 165.2 per square mile (63.6/km2). The racial makeup of the city was 95.73% White, 1.38% African American, 0.50% Native American, 0.88% from other races, and 1.51% from two or more races. Hispanic or Latino of any race were 5.28% of the population.

There were 291 households, out of which 44.7% had children under the age of 18 living with them, 57.4% were married couples living together, 15.5% had a female householder with no husband present, and 24.1% were non-families. 21.6% of all households were made up of individuals, and 11.3% had someone living alone who was 65 years of age or older. The average household size was 2.74 and the average family size was 3.15.

In the city, the population was spread out, with 33.0% under the age of 18, 7.7% from 18 to 24, 28.1% from 25 to 44, 18.1% from 45 to 64, and 13.1% who were 65 years of age or older. The median age was 32 years. For every 100 females, there were 87.7 males. For every 100 females age 18 and over, there were 85.1 males.

The median income for a household in the city was $28,542, and the median income for a family was $29,844. Males had a median income of $25,729 versus $21,125 for females. The per capita income for the city was $14,851. About 20.8% of families and 22.0% of the population were below the poverty line, including 27.5% of those under age 18 and 7.7% of those age 65 or over.

Education
The city is served by the Brownsboro Independent School District.

References

External links
City of Brownsboro official website

Cities in Texas
Cities in Henderson County, Texas
1849 establishments in Texas